The 2018–19 season was 26th season in the top Ukrainian football league for FC Karpaty Lviv. Karpaty competed in Premier League, Ukrainian Cup.

Players

Squad information

Transfers

In

Out

Pre-season and friendlies

Competitions

Overall

Premier League

League table

Relegation round

Results summary

Results by round

Matches

Relegation round

Relegation play-offs

 Match was abandoned after 90+6 minutes as Karpaty lead 1–3 due to Volyn fans assaulting the referee. UAF awarded Karpaty a 3–0 win and ordered Volyn to play their next home game behind closed doors.

Ukrainian Cup

Statistics

Appearances and goals

|-
! colspan=16 style=background:#dcdcdc; text-align:center| Goalkeepers

|-
! colspan=16 style=background:#dcdcdc; text-align:center| Defenders

|-
! colspan=16 style=background:#dcdcdc; text-align:center| Midfielders 

|-
! colspan=16 style=background:#dcdcdc; text-align:center| Forwards

|-
! colspan=16 style=background:#dcdcdc; text-align:center| Players transferred out during the season

Last updated: 8 June 2019

Goalscorers

Last updated: 8 June 2019

Clean sheets

Last updated: 4 June 2019

Disciplinary record

Last updated: 8 June 2019

References

External links
 Official website

Karpaty Lviv
FC Karpaty Lviv seasons